Schoolcraft County Airport  is a county-owned public-use airport located 3 miles (5 km) northeast of the central business district of Manistique, Michigan, a city in Schoolcraft County, Michigan, United States. It is included in the Federal Aviation Administration (FAA) National Plan of Integrated Airport Systems for 2017–2021, in which it is categorized as a basic general aviation facility.

The airport received $20,000 from the US Department of Transportation in 2020 as part of the CARES Act to help mitigate the effects of the covid-19 pandemic.

Facilities and aircraft 
Schoolcraft County Airport covers an area of 335 acres (135 ha) at an elevation of 684 feet (208 m) above mean sea level. It has two runways: 10/28 is 5,001 by 100 feet (1,524 m × 30 m) with an asphalt surface with approved GPS approaches, while runway 1/19 is 2,501 by 50 feet (762 m × 15 m) with an asphalt surface.

The airport has an FBO that sells avgas and jet fuel as well as a lounge, rest rooms, and limited amenities.

As of February 2023, the airport had no recorded data regarding aircraft operations for the previous 12 months. There are 6 aircraft based at this airport, all single-engine airplanes.

See also
List of airports in Michigan
 List of airports in Michigan's Upper Peninsula

References

External links 
  from the Michigan DOT Airport Directory
 

Airports in Michigan
Buildings and structures in Schoolcraft County, Michigan
Airports in the Upper Peninsula of Michigan